Amir Hossein Yousefi (born September 21, 1977) is a retired Iranian football player who played in the midfielder position.

Club career 
Yousefi started his career at Pas Tehran, before moving to another Tehrani club Saipa FC. There he enjoyed three good seasons, and in 2005 was transferred to Saba Battery.

Club Career Statistics
Last Update  1 September 2010 

 Assist Goals

References
Iran Pro League Stats

Iranian footballers
Association football midfielders
Pas players
Saipa F.C. players
Saba players
Sanat Mes Kerman F.C. players
1977 births
Sanat Naft Abadan F.C. players
Living people
Pegah Gilan players
Damash Gilan players